Melanopsis magnifica is a species of freshwater gastropod endemic to oases and wadis in Morocco.

Distribution and habitat 
Melanopsis magnifica exists mainly (though not exclusively) in shallow streams with stony substrates. It occurs in several localities, only three of which are recognized by the IUCN: Berkane, Fez, and Ouadi Korifla in Morocco. It also occurs in Ain Chkef, Agourai, Oued Boufakrane, Ain Chair, Ras Kebdana, Meknes, etc. Known M. magnifica populations are close to urban areas and are prone to population impacts as a result of pollution and habitat modification.

Taxonomy 
Melanopsis magnifica is defined historically be several subspecies and forms, excluding the nominal forms:

 Melanopsis magnifica berkanensis P.M. Pallary, 1911
 Melanopsis magnifica expansa P.M. Pallary, 1920
 Melanopsis magnifica ingens P.M. Pallary, 1927-28
 Melanopsis magnifica oranensis P.M. Pallary, 1911
 Melanopsis magnifica concolor P.M. Pallary, 1927
 Melanopsis magnifica serira P.M. Pallary, 1920
 Melanopsis magnifica senilis P.M. Pallary, 1939

References 

Melanopsidae